Daniel Ernemann (born 18 February 1976) is a German football coach and a former player who played as a defender. He is an assistant coach with SC Austria Lustenau. Ernemann played for Quelle Fürth, FC Bayern Munich II, FC Augsburg, 1. FC Union Berlin, Dynamo Dresden and had two spells with SC Austria Lustenau.

Honours
Union Berlin
 Regionalliga Nordost: 1999–2000
 DFB-Pokal: runner-up 2000–01

References

External links
 

1976 births
Living people
German footballers
Association football defenders
FC Bayern Munich II players
FC Augsburg players
1. FC Union Berlin players
Dynamo Dresden players
2. Bundesliga players
SC Austria Lustenau players
German expatriate footballers
Expatriate footballers in Austria
German football managers
SC Austria Lustenau managers
German expatriate football managers
Expatriate football managers in Austria
People from Amberg
Sportspeople from the Upper Palatinate
Footballers from Bavaria